Kathleen Russell (31 August 1927 – 27 August 1969) was a Jamaican sprinter. She competed in the women's 100 metres at the 1948 Summer Olympics.

References

1927 births
1969 deaths
Athletes (track and field) at the 1948 Summer Olympics
Athletes (track and field) at the 1952 Summer Olympics
Jamaican female sprinters
Jamaican female high jumpers
Jamaican female long jumpers
Olympic athletes of Jamaica
Central American and Caribbean Games gold medalists for Jamaica
Competitors at the 1954 Central American and Caribbean Games
Place of birth missing
Central American and Caribbean Games medalists in athletics
20th-century Jamaican women